Ahmed Omar Bani is a Libyan Air Force colonel who defected to the military of the rebel National Transitional Council. He is the current spokesman for the Libyan Ministry of Defence, taking over the position from Khaled al-Sayeh.

References

Living people
Libyan colonels
People of the First Libyan Civil War
Year of birth missing (living people)